Dilwale Dulhania Le Jayenge, also known by the initialism DDLJ, is a 1995 Indian Hindi-language musical romance film written and directed by Aditya Chopra in his directorial debut and produced by his father Yash Chopra. Released on 20 October 1995, the film stars Shah Rukh Khan and Kajol. The plot revolves around Raj and Simran, two young non-resident Indians, who fall in love during a vacation through Europe with their friends. Raj tries to win over Simran's family so the couple can marry, but Simran's father has long since promised her hand to his friend's son. The film was shot in India, London, and Switzerland, from September 1994 to August 1995.

With an estimated total gross of  worldwide, Dilwale Dulhania Le Jayenge was the highest-grossing Indian film of 1995 and one of the most successful Indian films in history. It won 10 Filmfare Awards—the most for a single film at that time—and the National Film Award for Best Popular Film Providing Wholesome Entertainment. Its soundtrack album became one of the most popular of the 1990s.

Many critics praised the film, which connected with different segments of society by simultaneously promoting strong family values and the following of one's own heart. Its success led other filmmakers to target the non-resident Indian audience, which was deemed more lucrative for them. It spawned many imitations of its story and style and homages to specific scenes. Dilwale Dulhania Le Jayenge was one of only three Hindi films in the reference book 1001 Movies You Must See Before You Die, and was placed twelfth on the British Film Institute's list of top Indian films of all time. In 2012, the film was included by critics Rachel Dwyer and Sanam Hasan in the 2012 British Film Institute Sight & Sound 1000 greatest films of all time. It is considered as the longest-running film in the history of Indian cinema due to that fact that it is still being shown in a cinema called Maratha Mandir theatre in Mumbai as of 2022.

Plot 

Raj Malhotra and Simran Singh are both non-resident Indians (NRI) living in London. Simran is brought up in a strict and conservative household by her parents Baldev Singh and Lajwanti while Raj is raised by his liberal father Dharamvir Malhotra. Simran always dreams of meeting her ideal man; her mother Lajjo warns her against this, saying dreams are good, but one should not blindly believe they come true. One day, Baldev receives a letter from his friend Ajit, who lives in Punjab, India. Ajit wants to keep the promise he and Baldev made to each other 20 years ago — to have Simran marry his son Kuljeet. Simran is disappointed, as she does not want to marry someone whom she has never met.

One evening, Raj enters Baldev's shop after closing time to buy beer. Baldev refuses, but Raj grabs a case of beer, throws money on the counter, and runs away. An infuriated Baldev calls Raj a disgrace to India. Meanwhile, Dharamvir agrees to his request to go on a train trip across Europe with his friends, and Simran's friends have invited her to go on the same trip. Simran asks Baldev to let her see the world before her marriage, and he reluctantly agrees.

On the trip, Raj and Simran meet. Raj constantly flirts with Simran, much to her irritation. The two miss their train to Zürich and are separated from their friends, but start to travel together and become friends. Raj falls in love with Simran on the journey, and when they part ways in London, Simran realises she is in love with him as well. At home, Simran tells her mother about the boy she met on her trip; Baldev overhears the conversation and becomes enraged with his daughter. He says the family will move to India the next day. Meanwhile, Raj tells Dharamvir about Simran and that she will soon get married. When Raj says he believes Simran loves him too, Dharamvir encourages him to go after her. Raj goes to her house to woo her and Baldev, but is informed by their neighbour that they have sold their house and moved to India.

Back in India, Baldev is reunited with his relatives and his friend, Ajit. A miserable Simran and her younger sister Chutki take an instant dislike to Simran's fiancé Kuljeet because of his arrogance. Simran pines for Raj, but her mother tells her to forget him because she knows Baldev will never accept their relationship. The next morning, Raj arrives outside of the house where Simran is staying and the two reunite. She begs him to elope with her, but Raj refuses and says he will only marry her with Baldev's consent. Without disclosing his acquaintance with Simran, Raj befriends Kuljeet, and is quickly accepted by both families. Later, Dharamvir also arrives in India and becomes friends with Simran's and Kuljeet's families. Eventually, Lajjo and Chutki discover that Raj is the boy Simran fell in love with in Europe. Lajjo also tells Raj and Simran to run away, but he still refuses. Baldev recognises Raj from the beer incident but eventually accepts him. However, after he discovers a photograph of Raj and Simran together in Europe, he slaps and humiliates Raj and tells him to leave.

As Raj and Dharamvir wait at the railway station, Kuljeet, who is angry to learn of Raj's love for Simran, arrives with his friends and attack them. Raj refuses to fight back until his father is struck by Kuljeet when trying to save his son at which an enraged Raj gains the upper hand in his struggle against Kuljeet and his friends and brutally beats him. Baldev and Ajit soon arrive and stop the fight, and Raj boards the departing train with Dharamvir. Simran then arrives with Lajjo and Chutki; she tries to join Raj on the train, but Baldev stops her. Simran begs him to let her go, saying she cannot live without Raj. Baldev, realising nobody loves his daughter more than Raj does, lets her go, and she runs and catches the train as it departs.

Cast 
Credits adapted from the British Film Institute.

 Shah Rukh Khan as Raj Malhotra
 Kajol as Simran Singh
 Amrish Puri as Chaudhary Baldev Singh
 Farida Jalal as Lajwanti "Lajjo" Singh
 Satish Shah as Ajit Singh
 Achala Sachdev as Simran's grandmother
 Himani Shivpuri as Kammo Kaur  
 Anupam Kher as Dharamvir Malhotra
 Parmeet Sethi as Kuljeet Singh
 Mandira Bedi as Preeti Singh
 Pooja Ruparel as Rajeshwari "Chutki" Singh
 Anaita Shroff Adajania as Simran's friend 
 Lalit Tiwari as Simran's uncle
 Arjun Sablok and Karan Johar as Raj's friends

Production

Origin and scripting 
Aditya Chopra assisted his father, director and producer Yash Chopra, during the making of Chandni (1989), Lamhe (1991) and Darr (1993). During this time, Aditya wrote several of his own scripts, including one he assumed would be his first film, but eventually became his second, Mohabbatein (2000). For three years, he worked on the story that would become Dilwale Dulhania Le Jayenge before approaching his father to direct it. Yash did not want to and tried to persuade Aditya to do it himself. As they were discussing ideas for the script, Aditya conceived the notion that Raj would seek permission for marriage from Simran's stern father, rather than eloping with her. He then became excited about the possibility of directing the film himself. After his mother, the playback singer Pamela Chopra, agreed that the idea was sound, he decided to make this his directorial debut. Aditya wanted to make a wholesome film that people could watch repeatedly. He wanted to diverge from the typical plot line of the time, in which lovers run away when their parents object, and show that if their love was strong enough, the parents would eventually understand.

In May 1994, Aditya read the first draft of the script to several members of the Yash Raj Films production team assigned to work with him, including a cinematographer, an art director, and a dialogue writer. They were not impressed, but Aditya held fast to his ideas. He was given total editorial control by his father, the producer, and made the film according to his own tastes and sensibilities. Aditya struggled with both the dialogue writer Javed Siddiqui and the song lyricist Anand Bakshi to develop words that were "young-sounding". There were personal clashes over writing credits on the final script. Pamela's friend Honey Irani believed she deserved a writing credit that she did not receive, and Siddiqui believed Aditya did not deserve partial credit for the dialogue. After Dilwale Dulhania Le Jayenge, neither of them ever worked with Yash Raj Films again. After approving the script, Yash was consulted about the songs, but mostly left the creative process to his son, and has firmly denied that he was a ghost director on the project. He did not shoot a single frame, and did not even view some portions of the film until it was nearly completed.

Casting 
Aditya originally wanted the film to be about a relationship between an Indian and an American. He wanted Tom Cruise for the role of Raj but was dissuaded by Yash, who did not want to use a foreign star. They decided their characters would be non-resident Indians (NRIs). Aditya approached Shah Rukh Khan to play the role of Raj. Shah Rukh was initially not interested because of the romantic nature of the role, having had success playing villainous roles. Aditya then asked Saif Ali Khan to play the lead role because he was having problems persuading Shah Rukh to do it. Saif declined for unknown reasons, as did Aamir Khan, causing Aditya to continue pursuing Shah Rukh. Aditya and Shah Rukh had four meetings over several weeks; he finally persuaded Shah Rukh by telling him he could never be a superstar unless he became "every woman's dream man, and every mother's dream son". Since then, Shah Rukh has expressed his gratitude to Aditya for helping to make him a star with this film. Shah Rukh said that fellow actor Salman Khan also encouraged him to do the role, saying that he thought the film would be very successful. Shah Rukh has also noted the similarities in the film's script to his own relationship with Gauri Khan before their marriage.

Kajol was the first choice to play Simran, to which she quickly agreed.  She and Shah Rukh had previously worked together in the successful films Baazigar (1993) and Karan Arjun (1995). Kajol said her character was very difficult for her to relate to, whereas Shah Rukh said Raj's personality was very similar to his own. Aditya chose the name Raj for the character, and the mandolin that he played, based on his admiration for the actor Raj Kapoor. After a successful screen test, Parmeet Sethi was chosen over Armaan Kohli for the role of Kuljeet Singh. In addition to his assistant director Sameer Sharma, Aditya asked for two additional assistants, his brother Uday Chopra and his cousin Karan Johar. Johar also played a small role in the film as Raj's friend. Sharmishta Roy was the film's art director and Manish Malhotra was its costume designer. While Malhotra had many new ideas, Aditya wanted to keep the clothing style simple; he did not want it to distract from the story. Despite this, Malhotra was responsible for the idea of Simran wearing a green dress in the song "Mehndi Laga Ke Rakhna", an unusual colour for a Punjabi bride.

Filming 

Dilwale Dulhania Le Jayenge was filmed in several 5-, 10- and 20-day schedules between September1994 and August1995. The first sequence filmed was for the song "Ho Gaya Hai Tujhko" with Kajol and Shah Rukh in Switzerland. The European journey scenes and songs were mainly filmed in Saanen, Montbovon and Gstaad, Switzerland. Other scenes were shot in England, at locations including Trafalgar Square, King's Cross railway station and Angel Underground station. Film's cinematographer Manmohan Singh, a regular collaborator with Chopra, shot the song "Tujhe Dekha To", including the iconic mustard fields scenes with Shah Rukh and Kajol in the mustard fields in Gurgaon on the outskirts of the National Capital Region Delhi. The cast faced difficulties while filming the final scene, which shows Simran running to catch the train on which Raj is travelling. The smouldering heat made it difficult to shoot and each time there was a retake, the train took 20 minutes to return.

Saroj Khan was the choreographer throughout most of the production, but after several disputes between her and Aditya, she was replaced by Farah Khan near the end of the shoot. After the film's eventual success, Saroj apologised to Aditya for underestimating him, but she never worked with him again. Farah choreographed the song "Ruk Ja O Dil Deewane", during which Aditya did not tell Kajol that Shah Rukh was going to drop her, as he wanted to capture her genuine reaction. The film's title was suggested by actress Kirron Kher; it came from the song "Le Jayenge Le Jayenge", in the film Chor Machaye Shor (1974). The Raj character sings parts of this song during the story, and it recurs at the end. Dilwale Dulhania Le Jayenge is believed to be the first Bollywood film with a "Title suggested by" credit. The film has since become universally known by the acronym DDLJ.

Towards the end of the principal photography, Shah Rukh had to split his time between this film and Trimurti (1995), spending half of his day on each film. In early August1995, when filming on Dilwale Dulhania Le Jayenge was not yet finished, a release date in October around the time of the Diwali festival was decided upon. Composers Jatin and Lalit Pandit were given only 10 days to complete the background score, and the first copies were printed on 30 September. After filming was complete, Aditya decided to make a Hollywood-style documentary of the film-making process, which had not been done before in India. Karan Johar and Uday were put in charge because they had already been recording some of the processes. On 18 October, two days before the film's release, the 30-minute special Dilwale Dulhania Le Jayenge, The Making was broadcast on television by Doordarshan.

Themes 
Dilwale Dulhania Le Jayenge repeats the usual conservative agenda of family, courtship and marriage, but it proposes that Indian family values are portable assets that can be upheld regardless of country of residence. To prove this, Raj, an NRI who was brought up in London, is portrayed as the story's "good guy", whereas Kuljeet, raised in India, is portrayed as the villain. This is a reversal of the roles in typical Indian films, which usually portray Indians as being morally superior to Westerners. Here, NRIs are validated as potential model Indian citizens.

The story aims to capture the struggle between traditional family values and the modern value of individualism. Although Raj and Simran want to be together regardless of her father's plans for her, Raj tries to win over his girlfriend's father rather than simply eloping with her. In this and other Indian stories, family values are ultimately considered more important than the romantic plot. Moral values and rules of conduct take precedence over individual desires. The film implies that "Indianness" can be defined by the importance of family life; whether at home or abroad, it is the Indian family system that is recognised as the social institution that most defines Indian identity.

In Dilwale Dulhania Le Jayenge, the purity/sanctity of women is being related to that of the nation. In the scene after Raj and Simran spend the night together, and Simran is concerned that something happened, Raj tells her: "You think I am beyond values, but I am a Hindustani, and I know what a Hindustani girl's izzat (honour) is worth. Trust me, nothing happened last night." This speaks to the Indian diaspora and their need to try and sustain their value system, and the man's responsibility to protect the Indian woman's sexual purity. In The Routledge Encyclopedia of Films, Ranjani Mazumdar says the film has a running theme of unfulfilled desires, which is exemplified by Raj's father telling him to enjoy life because his own was a struggle, and Simran's mother telling her to run away with Raj because she was unable to live her own dreams.

Scott Jordan Harris, writing for Roger Ebert's website, says the film's popularity lies in its ability to effectively convey two opposing themes appealing to different portions of society. He said, "It argues that we should follow our hearts and chase happiness wherever it leads, regardless of the obstacles in our paths, while simultaneously suggesting we should respect the ways of our elders, particularly our parents, and do nothing that challenges their will". Rachel Dwyer said the film was important for presenting marriage as an understanding between parents and children. While fighting the old tradition of the arranged marriage, it still encouraged the importance of seeking parental consent, even for a love marriage. According to Patricia Uberoi, Dilwale Dulhania Le Jayenge reiterates the theme of Hum Aapke Hain Koun..! (1994) in a self-conscious manner while also linking it explicitly to the fact that the protagonists tend to remind themselves and each other of what it means to be an Indian.

Music 

The Dilwale Dulhania Le Jayenge soundtrack features seven songs composed by Jatin–Lalit, a duo consisting of the brothers Jatin and Lalit Pandit. Anand Bakshi wrote the lyrics and Lata Mangeshkar, Asha Bhosle, Kumar Sanu, Abhijeet Bhattacharya and Udit Narayan performed the vocals. Jatin–Lalit was considered for the job when singer Asha Bhosle contacted Yash Chopra after meeting the duo. It was their first collaboration with Yash Raj Films. They secured the job after singing "Mehndi Laga Ke Rakhna" for Yash. In return, they ensured she sang one song, "Zara Sa Jhoom Loon Main". Pamela Chopra helped them select tunes and instruments to give some of the songs a Punjabi flavour. Bhasker Gupta, writing for AllMusic, said the soundtrack was the best of Jatin–Lalit's career, and that it "marked the beginning of the fifth wave in Indian cinema ...".

The soundtrack became the best-selling Bollywood soundtrack of the year, with 12 million official units sold by HMV, although it is estimated the same number or more copies were pirated. Gulshan Kumar sold an unofficial version of the soundtrack under his T-Series label. Combined sales of both the official HMV version and the unofficial T-Series version amounted to 20million copies. The total number of estimated sales including pirated copies range from 25million to over 100million.

In 2005, the album was judged the top Hindi soundtrack of all time by voters on the BBC Asian Network website. Anand Bakshi won his third Filmfare Best Lyricist award after 14 years, having two nominations for this film. The wedding song "Mehndi Laga Ke Rakhna" from the film became an all-time hit; it is played at weddings across the South Asian diaspora.

Release 
Dilwale Dulhania Le Jayenge opened on 20 October 1995 to sold-out shows worldwide. Every show in every theatre in Mumbai—save one—was completely full for the first week. The film was popular among both resident Indians and NRIs. At San Francisco's 720-seat Naz theatre, 1,000 people arrived for the first showing, and the theatre staff were forced to run another show late that night. In the UK, the film ran for over a year. As of March 16, 2020 the Maratha Mandir cinema hall in Mumbai had been showing for 1251 weeks (24 years).

Reception

Box office 
The film opened with over  grossed in its first month of release. The film's initial Hindi run earned 1.13 billion (valued at about US$35,000,000 in 1995) in India and about 200 million (valued at about US$6,200,000 in 1995) overseas; it became the highest-grossing Indian film of the year, and the second-highest-grossing film of the 1990s, behind Hum Aapke Hain Koun..! It was the second Indian film to gross over 1 billion worldwide, and one of the biggest Bollywood earners of all time. The film went on to gross a total of  worldwide .

Adjusted for inflation, Dilwale Dulhania Le Jayenge is among the highest-grossing Hindi films ever; its domestic net income (533 million at the time) is approximately  when adjusted for inflation in 2017. In later years, that theatre ran one matinee show per day at reduced ticket prices, which averaged about 50% occupancy.

Critical reception 
Dilwale Dulhania Le Jayenge received many favourable reviews. An initial review by weekly magazine Screen said of Aditya Chopra, "A young master arrives". Tom Vick, reviewing the film for Allmovie, said, "An immensely likeable movie, Dilwale Dulhania Le Jayenge performs the rarely achieved feat of stretching a predictable plot over three hours and making every minute enjoyable." When the film toured the US in 2004 as part of the Cinema India showcase, "The Changing Face of Indian Cinema", Charles Taylor reviewed the film for Salon and said, "It's a flawed, contradictory movie—aggressive and tender, stiff and graceful, clichéd and fresh, sophisticated and naive, traditional and modern. It's also, I think, a classic."

Writing for NDTV, Anupama Chopra said, "Perhaps the innocence of Raj and Simran's romance in which they can spend the night together without sex because Raj, the bratish [sic] NRI understands the importance of an Indian woman's honor. Perhaps it's the way in which the film artfully reaffirms the patriarchal status quo and works for all constituencies—the NRI and the local viewer. Or perhaps it's the magic of Shah Rukh Khan and Kajol who created a template for modern love, which was hip and cool but resolutely Indian." She also called the film a milestone that shaped Hindi cinema through the 1990s, and one of her personal favourites. In 2004, Meor Shariman of The Malay Mail called the film a "must watch" for Bollywood fans, and also for those seeking an introduction to Bollywood.

Raja Sen gave a reflective review for Rediff.com in 2005, calling the film one of the best Hindi films made in the previous 20 years. He said "Shah Rukh Khan gives a fabulous performance, redefining the Lover for the 1990s with great panache", and called Kajol a "real-as-life actress bringing warmth and credulity" to her role. Sen called the film well balanced and said only the fight scene and some mother-daughter dialogue can wear after multiple viewings. Omer M. Mozaffar, writing for RogerEbert.com in 2012, likened the film to a Disney Princess story, saying, "the young princess feeling trapped by the traditional patriarchy, seeking freedom through discovering the world, but finally finding it through silent, but inappropriate love. The Little Mermaid. Beauty (of the Beast). Jasmine (friends with Aladdin). Pocahontas. Aurora (Sleeping Beauty). And here, Simran." Scott Jordan Harris, also writing for RogerEbert.com in 2014, called it "one of the world's favorite films", and said it plays as a masterful soap opera, with one of the best screen couples ever seen.

Accolades 
Dilwale Dulhania Le Jayenge was ranked among The Times of Indias list of the "10 Bollywood movies you must see before you die". It was one of three Hindi films in the film reference book 1001 Movies You Must See Before You Die, the others being Mother India (1957) and Deewaar (1975). It was placed twelfth on the British Film Institute's list of top Indian films of all time. It is one of the films on Box Office India's list of "Biggest Blockbusters Ever in Hindi Cinema". The film won a National Film Award and 10 Filmfare Awards, setting the record at the time for the most Filmfare trophies.

Legacy

Historic box office run 

In 2001, Dilwale Dulhania Le Jayenge overtook Sholay (1975), which had run for over five years at the Minerva theatre, as the longest-running film in Indian cinema history. It has been showing at the Maratha Mandir theatre (which was famous for having shown Mughal-e-Azam (1960) for three years) since its original release in 1995. There are often people in the audience who have seen the film 50 or more times, but still clap, cheer, mouth the dialogues and sing along with the songs, raising comparisons with The Rocky Horror Picture Show (1975), the longest running film in America.

When a theatre strike in early 2011 threatened the film's uninterrupted run, the producer Yash Chopra contacted theatre owners to try and ensure the film would continue. He hoped the film would continue to run for at least 1,000 weeks, which it achieved in December2014. To commemorate the event, cast members including Shah Rukh Khan, Kajol, Anupam Kher, Farida Jalal, Mandira Bedi and Pooja Ruparel appeared on the television show Comedy Nights with Kapil.  Shah Rukh Khan, Kajol and director Aditya Chopra also attended a live chat with fans and a black tie event at the theatre on 12 December. The same day, they launched a coffee table book written by Aditya Chopra about the making of the film. Also in December, Yash Raj Films announced the availability of a collection of commemorative, licensed merchandise from various suppliers to mark the event.

The Maratha Mandir's management ended the film's run after 1,009 weeks on 19 February2015 because of low attendance (the last show was viewed by 210 people). However, after an outpouring of support from fans, and talks with the production company, they decided to reinstate the film. As of March 16, 2020, it had been showing for 1251 weeks (24 years). The projectionist, who has been working at the Mandir for 46 years, has watched the film more than 9,000 times. The COVID-19 lockdown in India caused the theater to close for eight months; upon its re-opening in November 2020, screening of the film resumed.

Influence 

Dilwale Dulhania Le Jayenge spawned many imitators of its story and style, especially throughout the 1990s. According to the Encyclopaedia of Hindi Cinema, it and a handful of other films and young directors started a trend for "designer" films. The authors said that these were "a carefully packaged and branded product in which every little visual and physical detail ... is of utmost importance". In Bollywood's Top 20: Superstars of Indian Cinema, Namrata Joshi said Dilwale Dulhania Le Jayenge "reinvented Bollywood romances so decisively that we can neatly divide them into two eras—before DDLJ and after DDLJ".

Yash Raj Films was previously known for using locations outside India for item numbers in its films. Dilwale Dulhania Le Jayenge started the trend for films designed to appeal to the Indian diaspora, which have foreign locations as integral parts of the story. The characters are themselves diaspora and tend to be able to move with ease between India and the West. Some later films that followed this trend include Pardes (1997), Kabhi Khushi Kabhie Gham... (2001), Kal Ho Naa Ho (2003), Salaam Namaste (2005), Neal 'n' Nikki (2005) and Kabhi Alvida Naa Kehna (2006). Dilwale Dulhania Le Jayenge became the first Hindi film blockbuster to feature NRIs as main characters. It helped to establish the diaspora market as a vital source of revenue for the industry; that market was seen as a safer financial investment than the desi market.

Several later films have paid homage to Dilwale Dulhania Le Jayenge. The Karan Johar-produced Humpty Sharma Ki Dulhania (2014) was directly inspired by it. The films Jab We Met (2007), Bodyguard (2011), Chalo Dilli (2011), Yeh Jawaani Hai Deewani (2013) and Chennai Express (2013) include scenes similar to the climactic train sequence, wherein a woman is running to catch a moving train and is helped aboard by a man with his outstretched arm. The British film Slumdog Millionaire (2008) contained a similar train scene, and its final dance sequence was partially shot at the same railway station as the Dilwale Dulhania Le Jayenge finale.

In October 2021, Aditya announced that he would be directing a Broadway musical entitled Come Fall In Love – The DDLJ Musical, based on the film. It will debut in the Broadway season of 2022–2023.

Impact 
Audiences appreciated the screen chemistry between Shah Rukh Khan and Kajol, who later worked together in several successful films including Kuch Kuch Hota Hai (1998), Kabhi Khushi Kabhie Gham... (2001), My Name Is Khan (2010), and Dilwale (2015), and are often referred to as one of Indian cinema's most loved on-screen couple. Sogosurvey conducted an online survey in 2016 in which approximately 47% of the people who participated voted Dilwale Dulhania Le Jayenge as Bollywood's most evergreen love story. Shah Rukh Khan credits this film with making him a star, and says it "changed the entire scene for romantic movies of the 90s". During an interview in 2002, he said "Whatever I'll stand for as an actor, in the whole of my career, whenever it ends, it will start with and end at Dilwale". The actress Farida Jalal said the film gave her career a boost, saying she got many offers and "could quote any price". It also helped the young careers of Pooja Ruparel, who received advertising offers, and of Sharmistha Roy.

The British Film Institute (BFI) commissioned a book about Dilwale Dulhania Le Jayenge. It was the first Hindi film chosen for a series of studies on international films, called "BFI Modern Classics". The author was Anupama Chopra and the book was released in 2002. It was reissued in paperback by Harper-Collins as Dilwale Dulhania Le Jayenge: The Making of a Blockbuster in 2004. After an unexpectedly long delay, the film was released on DVD by Yash Raj Films in 2002. The release included The Making and 300 Weeks Celebration documentaries, Success Story (highlights from the film's premiere), clips from the 41st Filmfare Awards ceremony and other interviews.

In 2006, members of the film crew were honoured at a dinner event to celebrate the film's 500th week since release. It was hosted by the Consulate General of Switzerland in Mumbai and by Switzerland Tourism. In 2010, Yash Raj Films signed an agreement with Indian and Swiss tour companies to provide a tour package called "YRF Enchanted Journey", to allow visitors to Switzerland to view filming locations used for famous Yash Raj films including Dilwale Dulhania Le Jayenge. In 2014, Yash Raj Films released Aditya Chopra Relives ... Dilwale Dulhania Le Jayenge (As Told to Nasreen Munni Kabir), an attractive but expensive book about the making of the film. In response to Indian prime minister Narendra Modi quoting the line "May the force be with you" from the American film franchise Star Wars during a visit to the United States, US President Barack Obama decided to quote a line from a Hindi film during his visit to India in January2015. He chose a line from this film, "Senorita, bade bade deshon mein ..." (Miss, in large countries ...), and added "you know what I mean". US President Donald Trump mentioned DDLJ as a "Classic Indian Films" during his visit to India in February2020.

Notes

References

Bibliography

Further reading

External links 

 Dilwale Dulhania Le Jayenge Official Site
 
 
 
 
 Dilwale Dulhania Le Jayenge at Bollywood Hungama

1990s Hindi-language films
1990s romantic comedy-drama films
1990s romantic musical films
1995 films
Best Popular Film Providing Wholesome Entertainment National Film Award winners
Films about Indian weddings
Films scored by Jatin–Lalit
Films set in India
Films set in London
Films shot in London
Films shot in Switzerland
Indian romantic musical films
Yash Raj Films films
Hindi films remade in other languages
1995 directorial debut films
1995 drama films
Indian romantic comedy-drama films
Films directed by Aditya Chopra